A list of courthouses in Georgia may refer to:

List of county courthouses in Georgia (U.S. state), county courthouses in the American state of Georgia 
List of United States federal courthouses in Georgia, federal courthouses in the American state of Georgia 
List of courthouses in Georgia (country), courthouses in the country of Georgia

courthouses in Georgia